The Dina River is a river that runs near Chamorshi in the state of Maharashtra, India.  It is home to the Dina Dam.

Rivers of Maharashtra
Rivers of India